Jennifer Anne Adams  is a New Zealand physicist who works on astroparticle physics and cosmology at the University of Canterbury. She was awarded a Rhodes Scholarship and was the winner of the 2021 Dan Walls Medal. She is a full professor, and was elected as a Fellow of the Royal Society Te Apārangi in 2023. Adams is the lead New Zealand scientist in the international neutrino observatory at the South Pole, the IceCube collaboration.

Academic career 

Adams was educated at Kaiapoi High School, where she first aspired to be an astronaut, before realising that actual discoveries about the universe were not made by astronauts. Adams completed an astronomy degree at the University of Canterbury and then was awarded a Rhodes Scholarship in 1992. Her doctorate, completed in 1995, was titled Cosmological phase transitions: techniques and phenomenology.

Following the completion of her PhD, Adams undertook postdoctoral research in cosmology at Uppsala University, where she also enjoyed the orienteering opportunities. 

Adams was offered a lecturing position at the University of Canterbury, and started work there in 1998. She was promoted to a full professorship in 2020.

Adams is the lead New Zealand scientist in the international IceCube Neutrino Observatory.

Awards 
Adams was President of the New Zealand Institute of Physics in 2008 when the Dan Walls Award was established. In 2021 she was awarded the medal herself.

In 2023 Adams was elected as a Fellow of the Royal Society Te Apārangi.

Selected works

References

External links 

 Ted talk in Christchurch
 Talk at the University of Canterbury "Hunting the elusive neutrino"
 2021 interview on Radio New Zealand with Jesse Mulligan

New Zealand academics
New Zealand women academics
New Zealand physicists
Alumni of the University of Oxford
University of Canterbury alumni
Academic staff of the University of Canterbury
New Zealand Rhodes Scholars